Viesturs is both a Latvian masculine given name, and less commonly, a surname. The name is derived from the Latvian viesturis, meaning "hospitable". The first recorded usage of the name in the areas of modern-day Latvia date from the 12th and 13th-centuries.

Individuals bearing the name Viesturs include:

Given name
Viesturs (also, Viestards, Viesthard, and Vesthardus; d. 1230), Semigallian duke
Viesturs Bērziņš (born 1974), Latvian cyclist
Viesturs Kairišs (born 1971), Latvian opera, film, and theatre director
Viesturs Koziols (born 1963), Latvian real estate developer, media and sports entrepreneur, photographer, and political and public figure
Viesturs Lukševics (born 1987), Latvian cyclist
Viesturs Meijers (born 1967), Latvian chess Grandmaster

Surname
Ed Viesturs (born 1959), American mountaineer

See also 
Order of Viesturs

References

Latvian masculine given names
Latvian-language surnames